Louis Robert may refer to:
Louis Robert (historian) (1904–1985), historian
Louis Léopold Robert (1794–1835), Swiss painter
Louis Eugène Robert (1806–1882), French naturalist, geologist and entomologist
Louis-Nicolas Robert (1761–1828), French soldier and mechanical engineer
Louis-Valentin Robert, French sculptor

See also

Louis Roberts, Canadian politician
Lewis Roberts (disambiguation)